Taiwanajinga albofasciata is a species of beetle in the family Cerambycidae, and the only species in the genus Taiwanajinga. It was described by Hayashi in 1978.

References

Apomecynini
Beetles described in 1978
Monotypic beetle genera